Christopher Devon Milton (born September 15, 1992) is an American football cornerback who is a free agent. He played college football at Georgia Tech. He has also played for the Indianapolis Colts and the Tennessee Titans.

College career
Milton played in 53 games with 33 starts at Georgia Tech collecting 96 tackles, three tackles for loss, one forced fumble, 14 passes defensed and five interceptions.

Professional career

Indianapolis Colts
Milton was signed by the Indianapolis Colts as an undrafted free agent on May 2, 2016. He was released on September 3, 2016, and was signed to the practice squad the next day. He was promoted to the active roster on November 19, 2016.

On March 12, 2019, Milton re-signed with the Colts. He was waived on September 1, 2019.

Tennessee Titans
On September 2, 2019, Milton was claimed off waivers by the Tennessee Titans. On November 26, 2019, Milton was placed on injured reserve.

On March 12, 2020, Milton was re-signed by the Titans. He was released during final roster cuts on September 5, 2020, but re-signed with the team the next day. On December 24, 2020, Milton was placed on injured reserve. Milton was released by the Titans on February 25, 2021.

New York Giants 
On March 30, 2021, Milton was signed by the New York Giants. He was waived on August 17, 2021.

Miami Dolphins
On November 29, 2021, Milton was signed to the Miami Dolphins practice squad.

References

External links
 New York Giants bio
 Georgia Tech Yellow Jackets bio

1992 births
Living people
American football cornerbacks
Georgia Tech Yellow Jackets football players
People from Charlton County, Georgia
Players of American football from Georgia (U.S. state)
Indianapolis Colts players
Tennessee Titans players
New York Giants players
Miami Dolphins players